Langxi County is a county in the southeast of Anhui Province, People's Republic of China, bordering Jiangsu Province to the north. It is under the jurisdiction of the prefecture-level city of Xuancheng. The government of Langxi County is located in Jianping Town.

Langxi County has jurisdiction over eight towns and nine townships.

Administrative divisions
Langxi County is divided to 8 towns and 4 townships.
Towns

Townships

Climate

Transportation
The county is served by Langxi South railway station, situated near Shizi town.

References

External links

County-level divisions of Anhui
Xuancheng